SS Keltier was a Belgian cargo ship that was torpedoed by  in the Atlantic Ocean while she was travelling from Milford Haven, Wales, United Kingdom, to New York, United States, in ballast.

Construction 
Keltier was constructed in 1913 with yard no. 282 at the Thompson Robert & Sons Ltd. shipyard in Sunderland, United Kingdom. She was completed in 1913 and sailed under the Belgian flag until her sinking in 1918.

She had a triple expansion steam engine driving a single screw propeller.

The 1916 incident 
She was badly damaged but remained afloat long enough to reach safe waters. She was then towed to Falmouth, Cornwall, where she was beached at the East side of the harbour entrance. She was repaired shortly after and returned to service on 12 December 1916. There were no casualties.

The sinking 
Keltier left Milford Haven on 29 September 1918 for New York in ballast in a convoy. She was last seen leaving the convoy on 1 October 1918. The 25 crew members took to the lifeboats and left the ship, but were never heard from or seen again.

Wreck 

References

Ships built on the River Wear
1913 ships
Steamships of Belgium
Cargo ships
Maritime incidents in 1916
Maritime incidents in 1918
Ships sunk by German submarines in World War I
World War I shipwrecks in the Atlantic Ocean
Ships lost with all hands